The 1998 Budapest mayoral election was held on 18 October 1998 to elect the Mayor of Budapest (főpolgármester). On the same day, local elections were held throughout Hungary, including the districts of Budapest. The election was run using a First-past-the-post voting system. The winner of this election served for 4 years.

The election was won by two-time incumbent, Gábor Demszky.

Results

References 

1998 in Hungary
Hungary
Local elections in Hungary
History of Budapest